This is a list of murdered political dissidents and human rights activists. The list is chronological.

References

Human rights activists
Assassinated
human rights activists